The Roman Catholic Church in Liberia is composed of one ecclesiastical province with 2 suffragan dioceses.

List of dioceses

Episcopal Conference of Liberia

Ecclesiastical Province of Monrovia
Archdiocese of Monrovia
Diocese of Cape Palmas
Diocese of Gbarnga

External links 
Catholic-Hierarchy entry.
GCatholic.org.

Liberia
Catholic dioceses